The South African Railways Class 6C 4-6-0 of 1896 was a steam locomotive from the pre-Union era in the Orange Free State.

Between 1896 and 1898, the Oranje-Vrijstaat Gouwerment-Spoorwegen placed 24 new Cape 6th Class steam locomotives with a  Tenwheeler type wheel arrangement in service, designated 6th Class L2. When British forces invaded the Orange Free State during the Second Boer War, these locomotives were taken over by the Imperial Military Railways. After the war, they were renumbered onto the Central South African Railways roster and designated Class 6-L2. In 1912, when the remaining 23 locomotives were assimilated into the South African Railways, they were renumbered again and designated Class 6C.

Manufacturers

The original Cape 6th Class locomotive had been designed in 1892 by H.M. Beatty, at the time the Locomotive Superintendent of the Western System of the Cape Government Railways (CGR).

The first 6th Class locomotives of the Oranje-Vrijstaat Gouwerment-Spoorwegen (OVGS) were purchased second-hand from the CGR and designated 6th Class L. These ten engines were soon followed by orders for new 6th Class locomotives directly from the manu­fac­turers.

The 24 locomotives in the first group to be built new for the OVGS were manufactured between 1895 and 1898 by Sharp, Stewart and Company, Dübs and Company and Neilson and Company. They were designated 6th Class L2 when they were delivered between 1896 and 1898. Six of these locomotives were built by Sharp, Stewart, numbered in the range from 70 to 75, nine by Dübs, numbered in the range from 76 to 84, and nine by Neilson, numbered in the range from 85 to 93. All these locomotives were delivered with Type YC six-wheeled tenders.

Service

South Africa
When British forces invaded the Orange Free State during the Second Boer War, all these OVGS locomotives were taken over by the Imperial Military Railways (IMR), but not renumbered. They were only renumbered after the war, when they were included in the Central South African Railways (CSAR) roster in 1902 and designated CSAR Class 6-L2.

P.A. Hyde, the Chief Locomotive Superintendent of the CSAR from 1902 to 1904, considered the 6th Class as about the best design for their weight ever made. Several of the CSAR's Class 6-L1 to 6-L3 locomotives, including ten of these ex-OVGS locomotives, were modified by Hyde by having their round-topped fireboxes replaced with larger boilers and Belpaire fireboxes and by having larger, more sheltered cabs installed. This conversion improved their performance tremendously, to the extent that they could be used in place of the 8th Class where they were formerly outclassed by load. This represented an increase in hauling capacity of some 12% while their coal consumption was reduced by some 5%. The ten locomotives which were later renumbered in the ranges from 554 to 559 and 561 to 564 on the South African Railways (SAR), had undergone this modification.
 
After the Simon's Town line in Cape Town was electrified in 1928, Class 6C engines that used to haul commuters on this line became dock shunting engines in Table Bay Harbour. This continued until they were gradually replaced by new Class S2 0-8-0 shunting engines from 1952.

During the 1930s, many of them were modified once again, when the Chief Mechanical Engineer of the SAR at the time, A.G. Watson, embarked on his program of standardisation and reboilered them with round-topped fireboxes once again. They retained the larger Hyde-designed cabs, however, and were not reclassified.

Sudan
During the Second World War, sixteen of the Classes 6 to 6D were transferred to the Middle East to assist with the war effort during the North African Campaign. The sole  locomotive in this group was no. 548. It was sold to the Sudan Railways Corporation in 1942 and renumbered M713.

Class 6 sub-classes
When the Union of South Africa was established on 31 May 1910, the three Colonial government railways (CGR, Natal Government Railways and CSAR) were united under a single administration to control and administer the railways, ports and harbours of the Union. Although the South African Railways and Harbours came into existence in 1910, the actual classification and renumbering of all the rolling stock of the three constituent railways were only implemented with effect from 1 January 1912.

When all but one of these 24 locomotives were assimilated into the SAR in 1912, they were designated  and renumbered in the ranges from 541 to 559 and 561 to 564. The fate of the one locomotive which did not enter SAR service, OVGS no. 89, later CSAR no. 365, is not known, although SAR no. 560 appears to have been reserved for it.

These locomotives, together with the CGR's  locomotives and the CSAR  and  locomotives which had been inherited from the OVGS via the IMR, were grouped into altogether fourteen sub-classes by the SAR. The  locomotives became SAR Classes 6, 6A, 6B, 6D to 6H and 6J to 6L, the  locomotives became Class 6Y and the  locomotives became Class 6Z.

Renumbering
The Class 6C locomotives were renumbered twice, first from the OVGS onto the CSAR roster and again in 1912 onto the SAR roster. The table lists their renumbering as well as their builder's and works numbers.

Preservation
Only one locomotive of this class survives. No. 544 is preserved by the Sandstone Heritage Trust at Sandstone Estates and is on display.

Illustration
The main picture shows SAR Class 6C no. 553, with a Belpaire firebox, while the following shows CSAR Class  no. 349, with its as-delivered round-topped firebox and small cab, as depicted on a SAR Museum playing card.

References

1340
1340
4-6-0 locomotives
2′C n2 locomotives
Steam locomotives of Sudan
Sharp Stewart locomotives
Dübs locomotives
Neilson locomotives
Cape gauge railway locomotives
Railway locomotives introduced in 1896
1896 in South Africa
Passenger locomotives
Scrapped locomotives